Petras is the archaeological site of an ancient Minoan town on northeastern Crete.

Geography
Petras is just east of the modern Cretan town, Siteia.  The site is situated on top of a small plateau and overlooks the sea north of Crete.

Archaeology
Metaxia Tsipopoulou began excavations at Petras in 1985.

The main building, which was two stories when it stood, is 2800 square meters.

Petras has a drainage system, double staircases, dadoes, frescoes and cut slab pavements.  Marks appear on the architecture of double axes, stars, branches, double triangles and Linear A signs.  Petras has yielded 3 Linear A tablets from its archives, plus a few other short Linear A texts.

Hieroglyphic archive
A hieroglyphic archive inscribed in Cretan hieroglyphs was excavated starting in 1995. According to the excavator, Metaxia Tsipopoulou, the archive was still in use at the time of palace destruction. Definitive edition was published in 2010.

The central building shares many of the features that are used to identify a Minoan palace apart from a regular building: pier and door partitions, alternating columns and pillars, and ashlar masonry.

Additions and building modifications were occurring as late as Late Minoan IB.

References

 Swindale, Ian http://www.minoancrete.com/petras.htm Retrieved 4 February 2006

Bibliography
Metaxia Tsipopoulou & Erik Hallager, The Hieroglyphic Archive at Petras, Siteia (with contributions by Cesare D’Annibale & Dimitra Mylona). Monographs of the Danish Institute at Athens, volume 9. The Danish Institute at Athens. Athens, 2010  (final publication) Download PDF File 59.56 MB
External bibliography at 'Petras Excavations'

External links

 http://www.minoancrete.com/petras.htm

Lasithi
Minoan sites in Crete
Populated places in ancient Crete
Former populated places in Greece